Nemacheilus pantheroides is a species of ray-finned fish in the family Balitoridae.
It is found in Israel and Syria.
Its natural habitat is rivers.
It is threatened by habitat loss.

References

pantheroides
Fish described in 1982
Taxonomy articles created by Polbot